Fábio de Souza Loureiro or Fábio Carioca  (born 10 September 1980) is a former Brazilian footballer, known for his career as a centre back for Liga Nacional de Honduras club Olimpia.

Club career
Fábio made his Campeonato Brasileiro Série B debut on 23 April 2004. He also played the next match against Náutico.

Fábio de Souza left Cianorte for Victoria on 22 August 2005. He then signed for C.D. Olimpia

In 2017, after 12 years playing in Honduras, de Souza retired from professional football.

Career statistics

References

External links
 Official website

1980 births
Living people
Footballers from Rio de Janeiro (city)
Brazilian footballers
Brazilian expatriate footballers
C.D. Victoria players
C.D. Olimpia players
Liga Nacional de Fútbol Profesional de Honduras players
Expatriate footballers in Spain
Expatriate footballers in Honduras
Brazilian expatriate sportspeople in Spain
Brazilian expatriate sportspeople in Honduras
Association football forwards